Gina Marie Trapani (born September 19, 1975) is an American tech blogger, web developer, writer, and technology executive.

Biography
Trapani was born and raised in an Italian Catholic family in Brooklyn, New York. She began her writing career in high school as a writer for New Youth Connections (now YCteen) a magazine written by and for New York City teens published by Youth Communication. Trapani graduated from Marist College and earned an MS in Computer Science at Brooklyn College.

Trapani founded the Lifehacker blog in January 2005, and led it until January 2009. She later joined at Expert Labs where she led development of ThinkUp, an open-source social media aggregation and analysis tool, which was shuttered in 2016. In 2017 she joined Postlight as Director of Engineering, and is now CEO.

Trapani has also been featured on yourBlogstory, a popular Bloggers featuring network. Trapani has published three books and has also written for other publications including Harvard Business Online. Wired magazine awarded her its prestigious Rave Award in 2006. Fast Company named her one of the Most Influential Women in Technology in 2009 and 2010. In 2019 she was named one of the most influential LGBTQ+ people in tech.

Personal life
, Trapani lives in Brooklyn, New York.

Trapani has two brothers. She married her longtime partner and friend, Terra Bailey, on June 17, 2008. Their daughter, Etta Rebecca Bailey, was born September 18, 2012.

Books

References

Further reading

External links
GinaTrapani.org
Dan Benjamin's The Pipeline: Gina Trapani Interview
Gina Trapani's complete BlogStory
Gina Trapani on Todo.txt "apps" for task management
Inspiring Tech Entrepreneur Blogger & Writer: Influential Women blog

1975 births
Living people
American bloggers
American lesbian writers
Web developers
Marist College alumni
Writers from Brooklyn
American writers of Italian descent
American technology writers
American women bloggers
TWiT.tv people
American women non-fiction writers
21st-century American non-fiction writers
Brooklyn College alumni
21st-century American women writers